Chapramari Wildlife Sanctuary (formerly Chapramari Wildlife Reserve, pron: ˌʧʌprəˈmɑ:rɪ or ˌʧæprəˈmɑ:rɪ) is close to the Gorumara National Park. Chapramari is about 30 kilometres from Chalsa and Lataguri in northern West Bengal, India. The total coverage of the forest is 960 hectares.

History
In 1896, an imperial forest-service administrator D.H.E. Sander first sent a proposal to the-then English-dominated Government of India that  could be developed into a tourism centre. The area was declared a national reserve forest in 1895 under the Indian Forest Act. In 1939, the name Chapramari Wildlife Reserve came to be used, while the Government of India, in 1998, gave it the status of a national wildlife sanctuary. The name of the region comes from 'Chapra', a variety of small fishes found in northern Bengal, and 'Mari', meaning 'abundance'. Chapramari receives waters from the Teesta, the Neora, Jaldhaka and the Murti.

Wildlife
A large variety of flora and fauna are found in the forests. Chapramari is known for its elephant population. Gaur (commonly known as Indian bison) are not uncommon in the Chapramari region. Rhinoceros, Deer, boars, and leopards are also found here. However unlike Gorumara, Royal Bengal Tigers are not found here. The place is popular with bird watchers, with parakeets, kingfishers, and green pigeons found in abundance.

In 2009, a marauding leopard was captured in Dooars and released into Chapramari.

Access
Malbazar Rail Station 15 kilometres away, is the closest major rail hub with  7 kms and  7.5 kms the smaller ones. Chapramari is located around two hours' drive from Siliguri, the principal city in northern Bengal. The access from Jalpaiguri passes through the dense forests of Lataguri - Batabari range.
National Highway 17 and Chalsa - Bindu -Jaldhaka - Todey Tangta Road passes through the middle of the Chapramari Wildlife Sanctuary.

Due to complications caused by monsoons, the wildlife sanctuary remains closed each year from mid-July to mid-September.

West Bengal Forest Development Corporation Limited operates a Chapramari camp.

Threat to elephants from railway
The wildlife sanctuary is crossed by the New Jalpaiguri–Alipurduar–Samuktala Road Railway Line between Siliguri - Malbazar - Alipurduar. Elephants have been killed by trains in several incidents. On 2002 February 8, Siliguri–Alipurduar Intercity Express train killed one female elephant and injured two tuskers.

2013 train accident

Surviving elephants initially fled but soon returned to the scene of the accident and remained there until being dispersed by officials.

The accident has been described as the worst in recent history. Officials plan to launch an investigation into its cause. The train's speed at the time of the collision, which was double that of the maximum specified by relevant guidelines, has been noted as one possible contributing factor. Minister of State for Railways Adhir Ranjan Chowdhury stated that the accident "happened outside the area which has been earmarked as elephant corridor" and that it "is the responsibility of the state government to protect the wildlife [because] railway officials cannot".

Photo gallery

See also
 Neora Valley National Park
 Gorumara National Park
 Mahananda Wildlife Sanctuary
 Pangolakha Wildlife Sanctuary

References

External links
West Bengal Forest Development Corporation Limited, the operator of Chapramari's camp
 
 

Wildlife sanctuaries in West Bengal
Dooars
Tourist attractions in Jalpaiguri district
1998 establishments in West Bengal
Protected areas established in 1988